"Le prince Aladin" is a song by rapper Black M with Kev Adams recorded trap single and the soundtrack to the film Les Nouvelles Aventures d'Aladin

Music video
The music video for "Le prince Aladin" was uploaded to YouTube on September 11, 2015 at a total length of three minutes and fifty-four seconds. The video gained more than for 3 months 47 million page views and more than 305 thousand likes for Black M it is new record.

Live Performance
Black M with Kev Adams act on the TV show Vendredi tout est permis on 12 September 2015.

Charts

References 

Black M songs
2015 singles
2015 songs